The following is a timeline of the history of the city of Pistoia in the Tuscany region of Italy.

Prior to 17th century

 62 BCE - Battle of Pistoria fought near town.
 5th C. CE - Roman Catholic Diocese of Pistoia established.
 595 CE - Cattedrale di San Zeno dedicated.
 8th C. CE - Sant'Andrea church, likely date of origin.
 772 CE -  built (approximate date).
 12th C. - Church of Sant' Andrea expanded.
 1108 - Pistoia Cathedral damaged by fire.
 1117 - Pistoia "defeated by Lucca."
 1150 - City walls expanded (approximate date).
 1240 - City walls rebuilt (approximate date).
 1294 - San Domenico church construction begins.
 1302-1306 - Pistoia besieged by Florentine and Luccan forces.
 1325 - Luccan Castruccio Castracani in power.
 1348 - Black Death plague.
 1351 - Surrendered to Florence.
 1353 -  expanded (approximate date).
 1359 - Battistero di San Giovanni in corte (baptistery) built.
 1368 -  built.
 1401 - Pistoia becomes part of the Florentine Republic.
 1494 - Basilica of Our Lady of Humility construction begins.
 1495 - Madonna dell'Umiltà construction begins.

17th-19th centuries
 1615 - Palazzo Ganucci Cancellieri refurbished.
 1630 - Plague outbreak.
 1642 - Accademia dei Risvegliati founded.
 1643 - Pistoia besieged by papal forces.
 1650 - Palazzo Marchetti sold.
 1694 -  (theatre) built.
 1696 - Biblioteca Forteguerriana (library) founded.
 1726 - Biblioteca Fabroniana (library) founded.
 1786
 Religious Synod of Pistoia held.
 Palazzo Bracciolini commissioned.
 1795 - Palazzo Rossi construction completed.
 1849 - Pistoia occupied by Austrians.
 1851 - Pistoia railway station opens.
 1860 -  (administrative region) established.
 1861 - Pistoia becomes part of the Kingdom of Italy.
 1864 - Porrettana railway begins operating.
 1881 - Population: 54,920.

20th century

 1906 - Population: 68,131.
 1921 - U.S. Pistoiese 1921 (football club) formed.
 1927 - Administrative Province of Pistoia created.
 1931 - Population: 70,397.
 1943 - October: Bombing of Pistoia in World War II.
 1966
 "Superachitettura" exhibit held.
 Stadio Comunale (stadium) opens.
 1969 -  (transit entity) established.
 1970 - Zoo di Pistoia established.
 1971
  in business.
 Population: 93,185.
 1974 - Istituto Storico della Resistenza (historical institute) established.
 1980 - Pistoia Blues Festival begins.
 1992 -  held;  becomes mayor.

21st century

 2001 - AnsaldoBreda engineering firm in business.
 2002 -  held;  becomes mayor.
 2003 - Associazione Storia e Città (history society) formed.
 2005 -  (transit entity) established.
 2007 -  (library) opens.
 2009 -  (cultural entity) established.
 2012 - Local election held; Samuele Bertinelli becomes mayor.
 2013 - Population: 88,904.
 2015 - 31 May: 2015 Tuscan regional election held.
 2017 - Local election held; Alessandro Tomasi becomes mayor.

See also
 
 List of mayors of Pistoia
 List of bishops of Pistoia
 History of Tuscany

Other cities in the macroregion of Central Italy:(it)
 Timeline of Ancona, Marche region
 Timeline of Arezzo, Tuscany region
 Timeline of Florence, Tuscany
 Timeline of Livorno, Tuscany
 Timeline of Lucca, Tuscany
 Timeline of Perugia, Umbria region
 Timeline of Pisa, Tuscany
 Timeline of Prato, Tuscany
 Timeline of Rome, Lazio region
 Timeline of Siena, Tuscany

References

This article incorporates information from the Italian Wikipedia.

Bibliography

in English

in Italian

  1656-1662
 I. Fioravanti. Memorie storiche d. città di Pistoia, Lucca 1758
 G. Tigri. Pistoia ed il suo territorio, 1853
  (Bibliography)
 
  (Bibliography)
  1899-
 O. Giglioli. Pistoia nelle sue opere d'arte, Firenze 1904
 A. Chiappelli. Storia del teatro in Pistoia dalle origini alla fine del sec. XVIII, 1913

External links

 Archivio Storico del Comune di Pistoia (city archives)
 Archivio di Stato di Pistoia (state archives)
 Items related to Pistoia, various dates (via Europeana)
 Items related to Pistoia, various dates (via Digital Public Library of America)

Pistoia
Pistoia
pistoia